Swishing refers to swapping an item or items of clothing or shoes or an accessory with friends or acquaintances. Parties must willingly give an item to participate in the transaction, once they have given an item they are free to choose something of interest from what others have offered. Value does not come into the equation, as swappers do not necessarily get an item of equal value and are free to choose anything that the other person if offering (without having to pay). Swishing is now being more widely practiced throughout the world and has evolved to include other items such as books and furniture. Not only do people hold 'swishing parties' either as a charity event or simply for the enjoyment of it (while recycling and saving money at the same time), but there are several websites where online swishes take place.

History
Swishing (deriving from the dictionary definition of 'to rustle, as silk' - which in the eyes of the swishing team means 'to rustle from friends') began in 2000 when Lucy Shea, founder of green PR firm Futerra, and her colleagues wanted to come up with a way to combine a love of retail shopping without contributing to increased consumption. It has since been endorsed by fashion model Twiggy in Twiggy's frock exchange, and as a result has become one of the most popular ways of swapping clothes.

Practice
A swishing party usually has a host who lays out guests' items at the venue after the guests have arrived. The host sends one group of guests to look at the items while other groups wait or do an activity. When an allocated amount of time has passed, the groups rotate. When all guests have seen the items, the host places everyone's name into a hat or bowl and draws them one at a time; when a guest's name is called, he or she claims an item. The host waits for only a few seconds before calling out the next name. The remainder of the items are them donated to charity by the host.

There are several types of variations.  If the swish is for charity, attendees have their names placed into the bowl along with an extra amount for a donation; swishes can be focused on specific items like clothes, crockery, shoes, handbags, and accessories; they can be held for family, friends, or workmates; or they can be less orderly, as a free-for-all instead of a drawing by name.

External links
BBC: "Twiggy's Frock Exchange"
The Guardian: "Swap till you drop", 5/18/2007

Charity fundraisers
Fashion
Recycling